The 1976 U.S. Clay Court Championships was a tennis tournament that was part of the men's Grand Prix and the women's Grand Prix. It was held in Indianapolis in the United States and played on outdoor clay courts. It was the 8th edition of the tournament in the Open Era and was held from August 9 through August 16, 1976. First-seeded Jimmy Connors won the singles title and the accompanying $25,000 first-prize money. Kathy May claimed the women's title and $6,000 in prize money.

Finals

Men's singles

 Jimmy Connors defeated  Wojciech Fibak 6–2, 6–4

Women's singles

 Kathy May defeated  Brigitte Cuypers 6–4, 4–6, 6–2

Men's doubles

 Brian Gottfried /  Raúl Ramírez defeated  Fred McNair /  Sherwood Stewart 6–2, 6–2

Women's doubles

 Linky Boshoff /  Ilana Kloss defeated  Laura duPont /  Wendy Turnbull 6–2, 6–3

References

External links 
 
 

 
U.S. Clay Court Championships
U.S. Clay Court Championships
U.S. Clay Court Championships
U.S. Clay Court Championships